The National Business Review (or NBR) is a New Zealand online news publication aimed at the business sector. 
It has journalists based in Auckland and Wellington.

History
The NBR was founded in 1970 by then-23 year old publisher Henry Newrick. Initially published as a fortnightly tabloid-format newspaper, it was briefly published as a daily newspaper from 1987 to 1991. New Zealand businessman Barry Colman was the NBR's publisher for 24 years, after buying it from John Fairfax & Sons in 1988. He sold it to Todd Scott in 2012.

The publication's website has a paywall model, where businesses and individual subscribers pay to access certain content. As of June 2016, the NBR had more than 4000 paying subscribers. The NBR launched an online radio platform in March 2015, NBR Radio, and in early 2017 it launched a video platform, NBR View. In 2020, the NBR ceased printing and became an online newspaper.

Rich List
The publication produces an annual Rich List with the estimated wealth of the richest New Zealanders. In 2020, Todd Scott announced that NBR had "called off the 2020 NBR Rich List" due to the economic impact of COVID-19, saying it would be "vulgar" to focus on wealthy people.

References

External links
National Business Review
Pay to View Archives

National Business Review
Business newspapers
1970 establishments in New Zealand
Publications established in 1970